The Complete Book of Outer Space is a 1953 collection of essays about space exploration edited by Jeffrey Logan. It first appeared as a magazine, published by Maco Magazine Corp. The first book publication was by Gnome Press in 1953 in an edition of 3,000 copies.

Contents
 Preface, by Kenneth MacLeish
 "A Preview of the Future: Introduction", by Jeffrey Logan
 "Development of the Space Ship", by Willy Ley
 "Station in Space", by Wernher von Braun
 "Space Medicine", by Heinz Haber
 "Space Suits", by Donald H. Menzel
 "The High Altitude Program", by Robert P. Haviland
 "History of the Rocket Engine", by James H. Wyld
 "Legal Aspects of Space Travel", by Oscar Schachter
 "Exploitation of the Moon", by Hugo Gernsback
 "Life Beyond the Earth", by Willy Ley
 "Interstellar Flight", by Leslie R. Shepard
 "The Spaceship in Science Fiction", by Jeffrey Logan
 "Plea for a Coordinated Space Program", by Wernher von Braun
 "The Flying Saucer Myth", by Jeffrey Logan
 "The Panel of Experts"
 "Chart of the Moon Voyage"
 "Chart of the Voyage to Mars"
 "Timetables and Weights"
 "A Space Travel Dictionary"

Reception
Groff Conklin of Galaxy Science Fiction said in 1954 that The Complete Book of Outer Space was "a fascinating collection" of pictures and text "of varying value ... but generally an exciting one".

References

Sources

1953 books
Spaceflight books
Gnome Press books